Yaragatti  is a taluka place in the southern state of Karnataka, India. It is located in the Belgaum district in Karnataka.

Demographics
At the 2011 India census, Yaragatti had a population of 9690 with 4799 males and 4891 females.

See also
 Belgaum
 Districts of Karnataka

References

External links
 http://Belgaum.nic.in/

Villages in Belagavi district